Helena Kristina Bergström Nutley (born 5 February 1964) is a Swedish actress and film director. From an acting family, she began her career in 1982. She has appeared on the stages of the Royal Dramatic Theatre  (Dramaten) and the Stockholm City Theatre, but is best known for her work in films. The Women on the Roof is considered a breakout role for her. Her most awarded film is The Last Dance, for which she received the Guldbagge Award for Best Actress in a Leading Role and Festival Awards in Montreal and Istanbul. Her husband, Colin Nutley, has directed her in several movies. In 2007, she directed for the first time for the film Mind the Gap. She is also a screenwriter and a singer.

Personal life
Bergström was born in Kortedala, Gothenburg, the daughter of actress Kerstin Widgren and Hans Bergström, a director and actor. Her maternal grandfather, Olof Widgren, was also an actor.

Bergström studied in Mississippi in the United States as an exchange student when she was a teenager.

She is married to Colin Nutley, with whom she has two children, Molly and Timothy, and a stepson, Daniel Nutley. They met while  filming Blackjack. At the time, Nutley was married and was 20 years her senior. They live in an apartment on Kungsholmen, an island in central Stockholm, where her grandparents lived. They also have a house in the country.

Career
She first appeared in a movie directed by her father in 1978, entitled Sweet Home. Bergström embarked on a film career in 1982, working in the television mini-series "Time Out".  A year later she appeared in the satirical comedy series Vidöppet, or Wide Open in English. In 1988, she graduated from "Teaterhögskolan", the theatre academy, in Stockholm, after which she worked at the Royal Dramatic Theatre  (Dramaten) and at the Stockholm City Theatre.

In 2008, she starred in a drama about Nobel Prize-winning author Selma Lagerlöf. She is known for her work in films, such as Miss Julie and House of Angels. The Woman on the Roof is described as the role that made her a noted actress. Although it was not a box office success, it was praised by the film critics. She became more notable after her "vivid portrayal of a tough city girl" during World War II in 1939. In 1990, she received the Swedish Film Academy Kurt Linder prize and in 1992 Teaterförbundet Daniel Engdahl scholarship.

She has been directed by her husband in films including Black Jack, House of Angels, The Last Dance. Her husband has directed Bergström in films involving sex scenes; she said he found this to be uncomfortable.

With Tove Alsterdal, a playwright and journalist, she wrote her first screenplay, Så olika (2009), or So Different in English. She first directed Mind the Gap , which was released in 2007. In 2015, she directed her fourth film, Holy Mess She is also a singer, singing more than 100 songs of Édith Piaf at the City Theatre. In 2002, she recorded an album of Piaf songs.

Filmography

References

External links

1964 births
Living people
Actors from Gothenburg
21st-century Swedish actresses
Best Actress Guldbagge Award winners
Swedish women film directors
20th-century Swedish actresses